Mayor of Alexandria may refer to 

 Mayor of Alexandria, New South Wales Australia
 Mayor of Alexandria, Virginia in the United States of America